Bladensburg can mean:

Australia
Bladensburg National Park, a former pastoral station and homestead in Queensland

United States
Bladensburg, Maryland, a town in Prince George's County
Bladensburg, Iowa, an unincorporated community in Wapello County
Bladensburg, Ohio, an unincorporated community in Knox County